Tremušnjak is a village in central Croatia, in the Town of Petrinja, Sisak-Moslavina County. It is connected by the D30 highway.

Demographics
According to the 2011 census, the village of Tremušnjak had 47 inhabitants. This represents 23.04% of its pre-war population according to the 1991 census.

The 1991 census recorded that 98.53% of the village population were ethnic Serbs (201/204), 0.49% were ethnic Croats (1/204), 0.49% were Yugoslavs (1/204) and 0.49% were of other ethnic origin (1/204).

Notable natives and residents
 Filip Kljajić (1913–1943) - antifascist, partisan and People's Hero of Yugoslavia

References

Populated places in Sisak-Moslavina County
Serb communities in Croatia